Thomas Whitney may refer to:

 Thomas Whitney (computing) (died 1986), involved in invention of pocket calculator
 Thomas P. Whitney (1917–2007), American diplomat, author and racehorse owner/breeder
 Thomas R. Whitney (1807–1858), politician from New York
 Tom Whitney (born 1989), golfer

See also
 Thomas Witney, English master mason
 Tommaso Ciampa (born 1985), wrestler born Tommasso Whitney